Hinoba-an, officially the Municipality of Hinoba-an (formerly Asia),  is a 1st class municipality in the province of Negros Occidental, Philippines. According to the 2020 census, it has a population of 60,865 people.

It is the southernmost town of the province. It is bounded on the north by Sipalay City and Candoni; on the south by Basay, Negros Oriental; on the east by the town of Ilog; and on the west by the Sulu Sea. The total land area of Hinoba-an is 421.50 square kilometers.

The town is home to the Magahat language, the indigenous language of Southern Negros as listed by the Komisyon ng Wikang Filipino. The language is vital to the culture and arts of the people.

History

Formerly a part of Cauayan, Hinoba-an was inhabited by natives called "Magabat". When immigrants from Panay came and settled in the coastal areas, the settlers began to group in the area where the town is now located. Traders visited to barter products like clothing made in Miag-ao, Tigbauan and Guimbal in Iloilo.

Spanish authorities did not occupy Hinoba-an during their time in the province since the area was still a jungle. It was visited only by people from Cauayan and the neighboring towns for hunting purposes, hence no important events were recorded about the coming of the Spaniards in the town until the early 20th century.

In the early 1900s, Don Estanislao Bilbao, a Basque émigré and patriarch of the Bilbao clan---one of the area's prominent families, begun a decades-long process of settling an area south of where Hinoba-an would come to be. In a few years, a significant plot of land had been rehabilitated to which thousands of germinating coconut husks were planted in precise rows. Maturing and bearing crop in under a decade, once coastal wilderness was transformed into copra producing land. Paddy fields were likewise developed further inland close to irrigation sources.

The subsequent grant of landownership, along with the total absence of government due to the area's remoteness, it became the basis for Don Estanislao's provisional administration of the people and the place. He became the area's primary, if not for a time, sole employer.  As a matter of moral imperative and practical necessity, he also became the de facto Judge and Sheriff, adjudicating upon and enforcing common law.

Through his marriage to Felicidad Rivas—a patrician heiress to a similarly homesteaded parcel of land nearby, Don Estanislao doubled the size of the holding. Hand-in-hand with Dona Felicidad, they lorded over a highly productive agricultural expanse that, from points north to south, ostensibly stretched for miles on end. The couple's lifelong beneficence and philanthropy endeared them to the local populace making the Bilbao name well-respected and well-loved. Generations of offspring have since reaped the fruits of their enduring legacy. A few have gone on to build legacies of their own.  Sons Joaquin and Francisco, and daughter-in-law Teresa, have each been elected town's mayor. Today, the Bilbao's have governed the municipality for a collective span of over thirty years.

When the Americans landed in Negros during World War II, Hinoba-an became a historical point of entry by the combined U.S. and Philippine Commonwealth military forces. Col. Salvador Abcede, district commander of the 7th military district, established his island headquarters in this town during the Japanese occupation.

Col. Jesús A. Villamor, aboard submarine USS Gudgeon (SS-211), landed at Ubong Point and occupied Ubong Cave as command post supply food and arms to guerillas.

After Liberation, Hinoba-an was rehabilitated by some of its pioneering residents. More settlements were established, schools were built, trails developed for the people's convenience in going to places and in transporting their local produce to nearby towns and villages. There was also a huge influx of Cebuano-speaking people during this time.

Geography

Barangays

Hinoba-an is politically subdivided into 13 barangays, two of which comprise the town proper (or poblacion):
Alim
Asia
Bacuyangan
Barangay I (Poblacion)
Barangay II (Poblacion)
Bulwangan
Culipapa
Damutan
Daug
Po-ok
San Rafael
Sangke
Talacagay

Climate

Demographics

The people of Hinoba-an predominantly speak Cebuano and Hiligaynon, which are used interchangeably every day. Tagalog and English are also understood to some extent.

Economy

Tourism

Salvacion Cave along the vicinity of pebbled beaches of Barangay Talacagay has a natural covered pools ideal for bathing.

Ubong Cave is where the late Col. Jesús A. Villamor, hero of World War II landed bringing firearms for the Philippine guerillas aboard the US Navy Submarine  in 1942, establishing the first radio contact with General Douglas MacArthur based in Australia at that time.

See also
List of renamed cities and municipalities in the Philippines

References

External links

 
 Hinoba-an Community website
 [ Philippine Standard Geographic Code]
 Philippine Census Information
 Local Governance Performance Management System
 Official Social Media Page

Municipalities of Negros Occidental